Northport is a historic maritime village on the northern shore of Long Island in Suffolk County, New York, United States. Initially designated Great Cow Harbour by 17th-century English colonists, the area was officially renamed Northport in 1837. In 1894, in an effort to localize governance, the community was incorporated as a village.

Northport is known for its Victorian era village center, still bearing trolley rails from a long since discontinued streetcar line which would transport village residents to the Long Island Rail Road station in East Northport. The village Main Street runs from the Village Green along the harbor-front to the former hamlet of Vernon Valley, which has since been subsumed by the neighboring community of East Northport.  As of 2010, the village has a population of approximately 7,401 and is served by the Northport-East Northport School District.

History

European settlement
The original inhabitants of the area now known as Northport were the Matinecocks, one of 13 Native American tribes of Long Island.  The Matinecocks called this land Opcathontyche, which meant "wading place creek".  After Dutch interest a few years earlier, the land was sold by Chief Asharoken, head of the Matinecocks, to three Englishmen in 1656.

With land that was well suited for farming, the early settlers grazed cattle on pastures around the harbor. The area soon became known as Great Cow Harbour.  (The nearby hamlet of Centerport was known as Little Cow Harbour.) The oldest house still standing in Northport, the Skidmore House on Main Street, was built in 1761. In 2009 the house was put up for sale, sparking the village to pass a historical preservation law.

Growth, change, and shipbuilding

In the early 19th century, Great Cow Harbor was still a rural farming community. By the 1830s, the village contained only eight dwellings.  But a new industry of shipbuilding brought rapid change and growth. The village shifted away from its farming roots as shipbuilding became the community's primary industry. By 1837, the village was being referred to as Northport.

The 1860 census listed Northport's population at 1,016. By 1874, it had become the most flourishing village on Suffolk County's north shore, with three ship yards, five sets of marine railways, two hotels, and at least six general stores.

Northport's shipbuilding boom lasted fifty years, but waned at the end of the century as steel-hulled ships began replacing the wooden vessels produced in the village.

Railroads and trolleys

On April 25, 1868, the Long Island Rail Road opened a station within the village of Northport. This was an essential transportation link for the village, especially for the growing commuter population. However, just a few years later the LIRR decided to move the Northport station to a new location in Larkfield to facilitate further railway extension to Port Jefferson. The new railway station located on Larkfield Road was opened on January 13, 1873, and retained the station name of Northport.

To avoid confusion with the former station located in the village of Northport, train conductors would refer to the station in Larkfield as "East of Northport" because the station was located east of the Northport railway junction which directed trains north to the station located in the village.  Despite the fact that Larkfield was primarily south of Northport, the area became known thereafter as East Northport. The original rail spur to Northport was afterwards known as the Northport Branch. After the old village station closed in 1899, Northport decided to build a  trolley line to take commuters between Main Street and the new Northport station located in Larkfield. The new commuter trolley opened in mid-April 1902.  The trolley would eventually become obsolete with the increasing popularity of the automobile, and the trolley made its last scheduled commuter run on August 19, 1924.

Incorporation and annexation
Although it was known by the name of Northport since at least 1837, the village of Northport was not formally incorporated until 1894, becoming the first village in the Town of Huntington to do so.  Over the years Northport has expanded from its original borders, annexing other established communities.

This settlement was originally known as Red Hook and changed names to Vernon Valley in 1820. By 1874 Vernon Valley had a population of around 150 inhabitants. Vernon Valley became part of Northport in the mid-20th century.

Northport also annexed the formerly independent settlement of Crab Meadow  (also known as Great Neck), as well as western parts of the Freshpond community .

Modern Northport

By the 1920s, after nearly a century of heavy commercial use, the waterfront which had supported the community for generations had fallen into decay. The village decided to purchase the land along the harbor and created Northport Memorial Park in 1932, which is a defining feature of Northport today.

In 1967, the Long Island Lighting Company (LILCO) opened the Northport Power Station, currently the largest oil-fired electric generating station on the East Coast. The four enormous stacks are a well-known landmark that can be seen from as far away as Connecticut across Long Island Sound.

The Northport Trolley which had ceased operations in 1924 enjoyed a popular revival in the 1970s and 1980s, transporting weekend tourists along Main Street. Unlike the original electric trolleys, this nostalgic replica was horse driven.  It also ran on rubber automobile tires rather than utilizing the original rails which still remain a visible element of Main Street to this day.

In July 1984, Northport garnered nationwide media attention for being the site of the gruesome murder of 17-year-old Gary Lauwers by his friend, high school dropout and alleged devil-worshiper Ricky Kasso. The events made national headlines and have since been recounted in books and movies, which caused the village to suffer a negative reputation for reputed satanism.

Every September the village of Northport commemorates its rich history with the celebration of Cow Harbor Day, which follows the annual Great Cow Harbor 10K race.

Geography

Northport is located at  (40.902803, -73.344069).

Most of the village is made up of the low, steep hills of Long Island's northern terminal moraine. To the west is the highly sheltered Northport Harbor, to the north is Long Island Sound, and to the east are woods and marshland.

A prominent feature of Northport is Steer's Pit (known simply as "The Pit" to locals), a large land depression carved into the cliffs adjacent to Northport Harbor and just south of the enormous LIPA smokestacks. This unusual geographic feature is the result of sand mining operations by the Steers and Steers Company. Mining began in 1923 and ceased in the 1950s. The mined sand was shipped by barge to New York City where, mixed with Portland cement and rock aggregate, it became the sidewalks of New York.  The area has since been utilized for home and condo use, and a portion of the Pit is a park used by local youth soccer and baseball leagues. The Northport Fire Department maintains a training facility in the Pit that is the site of the annual fireman's fair in the summer.

Culture 

Northport's annual Cow Harbor Day festival celebrates the history of the village, previously known as Great Cow Harbor.  It is held annually on the Sunday of the third full weekend in September, and since 1977 following the Great Cow Harbor 10K held the day before. Cow Harbor Day draws thousands of visitors to Northport each September.  Events kick off with a parade down Main Street, featuring floats, the local Northport High School marching band, antique cars and a temporary resurrection of the trolley that was once commonplace along this route in the early 1900s. Bovine related costumes and floats are also a common theme.  Celebrations are held at Northport Memorial Park at the harbor's edge.  live music, boat races, and other attractions. For the past thirteen years, the parade has been led by the US Coast Guard and Coast Guard Auxiliary Band from the local Ft. Salonga, NY Flotilla. Each year an appearance is made by the Regimental Band of the United States Merchant Marine Academy in Kings Point.

Government
The Village of Northport (which is roughly defined by the boundaries of NY Route 25A to the south, Waterside Rd to the east, Eatons Neck Rd and Locust Rd to the North, and Northport Harbor to the west) is an incorporated village with an elected mayor, deputy mayor, and a board of three trustees.

The village is serviced by the Northport Volunteer Fire Department and its own police department. The Northport Police Department, established in 1929, employs 17 full-time officers and conducts all patrol and arrest processing and most investigations and training in-house (the Suffolk County Police Department assists in specialized cases).  The department also has a marine unit which patrols the waterways.

Demographics

As of the census of 2020, there were 7,347 people, 2,906 households, and 1,926 families.

As of the census of 2010, there were 7,401 people, 2,955 households, and 2,074 families residing in the village. The population density was 3,290.0 people per square mile (1,276.3/km2). There were 3,052 housing units at an average density of 1,320.0 per square mile (510.1/km2). The racial makeup of the village was 92.04% White, 2.59% African American, 0.05% Native American, 1.25% Asian, 0.01% Pacific Islander, 0.30% from other races, and 0.75% from two or more races. Hispanic or Latino of any race were 5.09% of the population.

There were 2,955 households, out of which 33.2% had children under the age of 18 living with them, 59.8% were married couples living together, 8.5% had a female householder with no husband present, and 29.9% were non-families. 25.9% of all households were made up of individuals, and 8.0% had someone living alone who was 65 years of age or older. The average household size was 2.55 and the average family size was 3.07.

In the village, the population was spread out, with 23.8% under the age of 18, 5.8% from 18 to 24, 30.1% from 25 to 44, 28.8% from 45 to 64, and 12.1% who were 65 years of age or older. The median age was 40 years. For every 100 females, there were 94.6 males. For every 100 females aged 18 and over, there were 91.6 males.

The median income for a household in the village was $90,250, and the median income for a family was $104,488. Males had a median income of $78,715 versus $50,119 for females. The per capita income for the village was $43,694. About 1.6% of families and 2.8% of the population were below the poverty line, including 3.7% of those under age 18 and 2.8% of those age 65 or over.

Notable people

Artists
 Jules Olitski painter, sculptor

Performing arts
 Robert Burke, actor (Law & Order)
 Peter Calandra, Broadway, movie, and television pianist/composer
 Edie Falco, Broadway, movie, and television actress best known for her role as Carmela Soprano on The Sopranos
 Alison Fanelli, actress who is best known for her role on the television series The Adventures of Pete & Pete
Jordan Firstman, writer, producer and comedian
 Elizabeth Hendrickson, television actress best known for her role as twin sisters Frankie and Maggie Stone on All My Children
 Patti LuPone, Tony Award-winning Broadway and television actress, best known for her role as Eva Peron in Evita
 Chris Messina television actor, best known for his role as Ted Fairwell on Six Feet Under
 Dan Milano, television writer and voice actor best known as the co-creator of the show Greg the Bunny
 Gretchen Rau, Academy Award-winning motion picture set decorator
 John Scurti, television actor best known for his role as Kenny Shea on Rescue Me
 Craig Ricci Shaynak, television character actor

Musicians
 Wendy Andreiev (Wendy Wild), lead vocalist in the 1980s for several New York–based bands
 Wheatus, band
 Ian Matthias Bavitz (Aesop Rock), hip-hop, rap artist
 Brendan B. Brown, lead vocalist for the band Wheatus
 Frank Funaro, drummer for Cracker
 Steve Nardelli singer and songwriter with The Syn
 Blue Öyster Cult, band
 Bassam Saba, musician and co-founder of the New York Arabic Orchestra

Writers
 Antoine de Saint-Exupéry, wrote Le Petit Prince (The Little Prince) during the summer of 1942 in The Bevin Mansion in Asharoken.
 Edwin G. Burrows, won the 1999 Pulitzer Prize for History for the book Gotham: A History of New York City to 1898
 Greg Fox, nationally syndicated comic strip artist/writer (his comic Kyle's Bed & Breakfast'' takes place in Northport)
 Jack Kerouac, Beat novelist and writer commonly credited as the catalyst for the 1960s counterculture movement

Sports
 Greg Buttle, former NFL football player for the New York Jets
 Darius Kasparaitis, former NHL ice hockey player for the New York Islanders, Pittsburgh Penguins, Colorado Avalanche and the New York Rangers
 Andy Lally, United SportsCar Championship, GRAND-AM and NASCAR race car driver, and street luge racer
 Allie Long, U.S. Olympic soccer player
 Audrey Shin, figure skater

Others
 Nicholas Allard (born 1952), Dean and President of Brooklyn Law School.
 Andrew Geller, architect
 Bruce Morrison, former United States congressman from Connecticut. He grew up in Northport and attended Northport High School.
 Alia Sabur, youngest professor in history
 Ricky Kasso, murderer

See also
 Northport-East Northport Union Free School District
 Northport High School
 Cow Harbor Day
 Great Cow Harbor 10K
 Northport Power Station
 Asharoken, New York
 East Northport, New York
 Eatons Neck, New York

References

Further reading

External links

 Village of Northport official website
 Northport Chamber of Commerce
 Northport Historical Society
 QuickTime Panorama of Steers Pit

 
Villages in New York (state)
Villages in Suffolk County, New York
Populated coastal places in New York (state)